is a railway station in the northern part of the city of Itō, Shizuoka Prefecture, Japan, operated by East Japan Railway Company (JR East).

Lines
Usami Station is served by the Itō Line, and is located 13.0 kilometers from the starting point of the line at Atami Station and 117.6 kilometers from Tokyo Station.

Station layout
Usami Station has two opposed ground level side platforms connected by a footbridge. The station building has automated ticket machines and Suica automated turnstiles, and is unattended.

Platforms

History 
Freight services were discontinued on November 1, 1958. On April 1, 1987, along with division and privatization of the Japan National Railway, East Japan Railway Company started operating this station.

Passenger statistics
In fiscal 2013, the station was used by an average of 1254 passengers daily (boarding passengers only).

Surrounding area
Usami Onsen

See also
 List of Railway Stations in Japan

References

External links

 JR East Usami Station

Railway stations in Japan opened in 1938
Railway stations in Shizuoka Prefecture
Itō Line
Stations of East Japan Railway Company
Itō, Shizuoka